The women's team sprint race of the 2015–16 ISU Speed Skating World Cup 1, arranged in the Olympic Oval, in Calgary, Alberta, Canada, was held on 14 November 2015.

The Japanese team won the race, while the Chinese team came second, and the Canadian team came third. As this was the first time the event was skated as an official ISU competition, the winning time automatically became the world record. The rest of the results became national records.

Results
The race took place on Saturday, 14 November, in the afternoon session, scheduled at 16:17.

Note: WR = world record, NR = national record.

References

Women team sprint
1